Mike Oldfield - A Life Dedicated To Music is a biography of Mike Oldfield published in May 2013 by Brimstone Press.  It was written by Chris Dewey who is also the editor of Dark Star, the official fan magazine for Mike Oldfield.

Content 
The book covers the whole of Oldfield's life from his early schooldays up to his appearance at the 2012 Summer Olympics opening ceremony.  Although predominantly covering Oldfield's music drawing on interviews with collaborating musicians, family members and school friends conducted by Dewey and his Dark Star colleagues, it also gives an insight into Dewey's life as a fan.

External links 
 
 Dark Star website

Mike Oldfield
2013 non-fiction books
Biographies about musicians